The 2012 Korean Tour was the second season of the Korean Tour to carry Official World Golf Ranking points. The season consisted of 13 events, seven of which were co-sanctioned by other tours. All the tournament had prize funds of at least 400 million won (approximately US$350,000). Four had prize funds of 1 billion won (US$900,000) while the Ballantine's Championship has a prize fund of 2.2 million euros (approximately US$2.9 million).

Schedule
The following table lists official events during the 2012 season.

Order of Merit
The Order of Merit was based on prize money won during the season, calculated using a points-based system.

Notes

References

External links
English-language version of official Korea PGA site

2012 Korean Tour
2012 in golf
2012 in South Korean sport